Parkland College is a public community college in Champaign, Illinois.  It is part of the Illinois Community College System serving Community College District 505 which includes parts of Coles, Champaign, DeWitt, Douglas, Edgar, Ford, Iroquois, Livingston, Moultrie, McLean, Piatt, and Vermilion Counties. Parkland College enrolls approximately 9,000 students annually, with more than 340,000 students served since September 1967.

William M. Staerkel Planetarium is located at Parkland College.

Campus

Located at 2400 W. Bradley Avenue in Champaign's northwest corner, Parkland's 255-acre main campus is centrally accessible to the 54 communities it serves. It lies in close proximity to the University of Illinois at Urbana-Champaign. Its off-campus locations for instruction include Parkland College on Mattis at 1307-1319 N. Mattis Avenue, Champaign, and the Institute of Aviation at the University of Illinois Willard Airport in Savoy, Illinois.

History

Bolstered with state support from the Illinois Public Junior College Act of 1965, "Illinois Junior College District 505" was established in March 1966 by a referendum of residents from incorporated and unincorporated areas surrounding Champaign-Urbana. The college was renamed Parkland Community College in 1967 before its first fall semester classes began. William M. Staerkel was Parkland's first president, serving the college from 1967 to 1987. While the first classes were held at temporary sites in downtown Champaign, the school's permanent campus opened in fall 1973.

Parkland College has been accredited by the North Central Association of Colleges and Schools, Higher Learning Commission since 1972. Its seven-member Board of Trustees is elected by the residents of the district, with each trustee serving a six-year term. The board provides local control and direction for the college, operating in accordance with Parkland's established policies and procedures.

Academics

Parkland College confers the Associate in Arts, Associate in Science, Associate in Fine Arts, Associate in Engineering Science, Associate in Applied Science, and Associate in General Studies degrees.

Today, approximately 9,000 students enroll in Parkland College credit courses annually. More than 100 degree and certificate programs of study are available, leading students to career and job placement or to educational transfer to four-year colleges and universities. Parkland College offers courses in online, in-person, and hybrid formats. The college also offers a robust noncredit course offering through its Community Education department.

Parkland College provides numerous academic support services and resources for students, including the Parkland College Learning Commons, a unified learning assistance center that provides peer tutoring, a writing lab, tutoring by math faculty, developmental learning modules, study skills tutorials, and more. The Parkland College Library, also part of the learning commons, holds a collection of over 120,000 volumes; its materials help fulfill student curricular/academic program needs as well as the personal enrichment and lifelong learning needs of the college community. In conjunction with the college's Center for Excellence in Teaching and Learning, the Library also administers SPARK, Parkland's digital institutional repository of scholarly works.

Culture and community

Parkland's cultural center contains a 320-seat performing arts theater and a 50-foot dome planetarium. The Parkland Theatre, William M. Staerkel Planetarium, and Giertz Gallery offer free or affordable performances, programs, and exhibits year-round to campus and community members. Parkland's radio station is WPCD 88.7 FM and its student-run newspaper is the Prospectus. The college offers an educational cable channel, PCTV, which airs cultural/educational and classic shows; a state-licensed Child Development Center which serves Parkland students and area residents; and a student-run music production studio.

Student life

More than 20 campus clubs and organizations at Parkland College provide students with opportunities for volunteerism, leadership development, and camaraderie. While many of these are organized based on academic fields, such as the Business Club, Parkland Motorsports, and the Pre-Law Club, diversity is rich among the established clubs, with groups among them such as Alpha Phi Omega, the International Students Association, Japanese Culture Club, Black Student Association, Club Latino, Muslim Student Association, Parkland Christian Fellowship, and Parkland PRIDE! (LGBTQ support group).

Athletics
Parkland students also take part in extramural team sports under the mascot Cobras, including baseball, softball, volleyball, men's and women's basketball, golf, and men's and women's soccer. A Division II (Division I Soccer) member of the National Junior Collegiate Athletic Association, the Parkland Cobras mark the following accomplishments:

NJCAA Baseball Champions: 2002, 2009
NJCAA Women's Volleyball Champions: 1999, 2015, 2016, 2021
NJCAA Men's Basketball Champions: 1986
NCJAA Men's Golf Champions: 2021

Notable alumni
 Juan Acevedo – Major League Baseball player
 Bonnie Blair – Five-time U.S. Olympic Gold Medalist, Speedskating
 Mark Carlson – Major League Baseball umpire
 Jeremih Felton – R & B singer
 Shane Heams – U.S. Olympian, Baseball (2000)
 Kevin Kiermaier – Tampa Bay Rays outfielder
 David Patrick – Gold Medalist, 400-meter hurdle, IAAF World Cup; U.S. Olympian (1992)
 Spencer Patton- Major League Baseball player
 Kevin Roberson – Major League Baseball player
Louis Sola - Federal Maritime Commission
 Michael Damian Thomas - Hugo Award-winning science fiction editor and podcaster, publisher of Uncanny Magazine
 Dan Winkler — Major League Baseball pitcher
 Nick Wittgren – Major League Baseball pitcher

References

External links
 

Buildings and structures in Champaign, Illinois
Community colleges in Illinois
Educational institutions established in 1966
Education in Champaign County, Illinois
NJCAA athletics
Sports teams in Champaign–Urbana, Illinois
Tourist attractions in Champaign County, Illinois
1966 establishments in Illinois